Clifton Heights is a neighborhood of St. Louis, Missouri, US, located along the southwest border of the city and highlighted by a park — Clifton Park  — with a playground and a lake.

The neighborhood is mostly residential, with a history dating back to the early 19th century and houses of varying architectural styles, including some Victorian and numerous Arts and Crafts homes. The curving streets surrounding the park and the hills that slope downward toward I-44 are somewhat unusual for St. Louis City, and give the neighborhood a distinctive feeling. Bounded on the north and west by I-44, on the east by Hampton Ave., and on the south by Arsenal St., Clifton Heights is located in southwest St. Louis.

Mason School in Clifton Heights is an elementary school in the St. Louis Public School System. The neighborhood is in the 24th ward of the City of St. Louis, currently represented by Alderman Scott Ogilvie. The neighborhood holds an annual "Party in the Park" in fall each year that includes games, crafts and other family activities. Clifton Heights has numerous small businesses, a VFW post and a Drury Inn and Suites at the corner of I-44 and Hampton Avenue that was the subject of much neighborhood controversy regarding the demolition of homes and the placement of a large hotel next to small houses.

Demographics

In 2020, Clifton Height's racial makeup was 86.2% White, 3.9% Black, 0.1% Native American, 2.3% Asian, 5.8% Two or More Races, and 1.6% Some Other Race. 3.3% of the population was of Hispanic or Latino origin.

References 

Neighborhoods in St. Louis